KPWW (95.9 FM, Power 95-9) is a radio station broadcasting a Top 40 contemporary hit radio format. Licensed to Hooks, Texas, United States, it serves the Texarkana area. The station is currently owned by Townsquare Media.  Studios are located on Arkansas Boulevard in Texarkana, Arkansas and its transmitter is in Red Lick, Texas.

References

External links
KPWW Power 95-9 Official website

PWW
Contemporary hit radio stations in the United States
Townsquare Media radio stations